Thomas Head Raddall DSO (9 December 1876 – 9 August 1918) was a British sports shooter. He competed in the team 300 metre free rifle event at the 1908 Summer Olympics. He was killed in action during World War I in France, having attained the rank of Lieutenant-Colonel in the Canadian Infantry and been awarded the DSO. He was buried at the Commonwealth military Manitoba Cemetery at Caix, France, and left a widow, Ellen, who was resident in Halifax, Nova Scotia, Canada. His son was Canadian writer Thomas Head Raddall.

See also
 List of Olympians killed in World War I

References

External links
 

1876 births
1918 deaths
British male sport shooters
Olympic shooters of Great Britain
Shooters at the 1908 Summer Olympics
People from Farnborough, Hampshire
Sportspeople from Hampshire
Canadian military personnel killed in World War I
Canadian Expeditionary Force officers
Companions of the Distinguished Service Order